The 2016 Anzac Test (known as the Downer Anzac Test due to sponsorship) was a rugby league test match played between Australia and New Zealand at Hunter Stadium in Newcastle. It was the 17th Anzac Test played between the two nations since the first was played under the Super League banner in 1997.

The game marked the international coaching debut of Mal Meninga for Australia since taking over the position from Tim Sheens in late 2015. Meninga, a 4 time Kangaroo Tourist (the only player ever to do so), a World Cup winning captain and a veteran of 46 tests for Australia between 1982–94, has previously coached Queensland to 9 State of Origin series wins in 10 years (including a record 8 series wins in succession from 2006-2013) in the years prior to taking over as Kangaroos coach.

This was the first of two matches between Australia and New Zealand before the 2016 Rugby League Four Nations in late October and November. The second match will be played at the nib Stadium in Perth, Western Australia on 15 October.

Meninga broke tradition and named the Australian team a few days early, which included 4 debutants; Blake Ferguson, Josh McGuire, Michael Morgan and Fijian-born Semi Radradra.

The New Zealand team was named on 1 May.

Pre-game

National anthems
 Russ Walker - New Zealand National Anthem
 Adrian Li Donni - Australian National Anthem

Squads

1 - Peta Hiku was originally selected to play but withdrew due to injury. He was replaced by Gerard Beale.
2 - Shaun Kenny-Dowall and Brad Takairangi were originally selected to play but both players withdrew. Tohu Harris was shifted from five-eighth to centre and Kodi Nikorima was shifted from the bench to five-eighth as a result.
Aidan Guerra and Michael Jennings were a part of the Kangaroos squad but did not play in the match.
Alex Glenn and Danny Levi were a part of the Kiwis squad but did not play in the match.

Match summary

Notes:
 This was the annual 2016 Anzac Test.
 Australia's win ended a 3-match losing streak against New Zealand.
 This was the first time New Zealand were held scoreless in a test-match since 2007.
 With the victory, Australia reclaim the Bill Kelly Memorial Trophy.
 Martin Taupau and Sam Moa made their 10th test appearance for New Zealand.
 Blake Ferguson, Josh McGuire, Michael Morgan and Fijian-born Semi Radradra made their international debuts for Australia while Dallin Watene-Zelezniak, Kenny Bromwich and Manu Maʻu made their international debuts for New Zealand.

Women's Test

A Women's rugby league match between the Australian Jillaroos and New Zealand Kiwi Ferns will serve as the curtain-raiser for the main game.

New Zealand coach Alan Jackson named an 18-strong squad in preparation for the Trans-Tasman Test.

A few days later, Australian coach Steve Folkes announced his 18-strong squad for the Trans-Tasman Test.

Women's squads

The 18th woman is a cover for a possible injury or suspension and unless called up to the starting line-up or the bench, does not actually play.

Match summary

References

2016 in Australian rugby league
2016 in New Zealand rugby league
Anzac Test
Rugby league in Newcastle, New South Wales
International rugby league competitions hosted by Australia